Tuting-Yingkiong is one of the 60 constituencies in the Arunachal Pradesh Legislative Assembly in India. The MLA as of 2019 is Alo Libang.

Tuting and Yingkiong are village and administrative town headquarters respectively of Upper Siang in the Indian state of Arunachal Pradesh.  Upper Siang is the name of the district where the village Tuting and Yingkiong Town are located. The village was recently in spotlight due to Chinese People's Liberation Army incursion and construction of roads inside Indian territory. The village is under the administrative control of an additional deputy commissioner.

Member of Legislative Assembly

Election results

2019

See also
List of constituencies of Arunachal Pradesh Legislative Assembly
Arunachal Pradesh Legislative Assembly

References

External links

Villages in Upper Siang district
Assembly constituencies of Arunachal Pradesh